The East Midlands Regional League was a football league in the East Midlands region of England between 1967 and 1985. The league was formed in 1967, taking all but four of the clubs from the Premier Division of the Central Alliance. In 1985 it merged with the Central Alliance to form the Midlands Regional Alliance.

List of champions

Member clubs

Alfreton Town Reserves
Allenton Athletic
Allenton Athletic Reserves
Alvaston Athletic
Alvaston St. Helen's
Anstey Nomads
Anstey Town
Arnold Kingswell
Ashbourne Town
Aspley Old Boys
Belper Town Reserves
Belper United
Blackwell Miners Welfare
Borrowash Victoria
Borrowash Victoria Reserves
Breadsall Amateurs
Brimington
Brinsley
Bulwell Forest Villa
Butterley Brick
Chesterfield Tube Works
Chesterfield Tube Works Reserves
Church Warsop Welfare
Clay Cross Miners Welfare
Clay Cross Works
Clifton All Whites
Clifton All Whites Reserves
Creswell Colliery
Crewton Sports
Derby Carriage & Wagon
Derby Roe Farm
Derby Roe Farm Athletic Reserves
Derby Venturers
Draycott
Draycott Amateurs
Eastwood Racing
Eastwood Town
Eastwood Town Reserves
Enderby Town
Enderby Town Reserves
Fairham
Folk House
Gameworld Villa
Gotham United
Graham Street Prims
Grantham St. John's
Gresley Rovers
Harrowby United
Heanor Town Reserves
Heeley Amateurs
Hinckley College
Holbrook St. Michael's
Hucknall Colliery Welfare
Hucknall Masons Arms
Hucknall Town
Ilkeston Town Reserves
International Combustion
Kimberley Town
Kimberley Town Reserves
Kingswell
LP Sports
Leicester South End
Leys & Ewarts
Linby
Linby Colliery Welfare
Littleover British Legion
Littleover Old Boys
Long Eaton Grange
Long Eaton Grange Reserves
Long Eaton United Reserves
Loughborough Dynamo
Loughborough United Reserves
Mackworth St. Francis
Meadows Old Boys
Mickleover Royal British Legion
Moorgreen Colliery
New Villa
New Villa Reserves
Newark Town
Newhall United
Ollerton Colliery
Pirelli
Radcliffe Olympic
Radford Olympic
Raleigh Athletic
Randall Sports
Ransome & Marles
Ripley Town
Ripley Town Reserves
Rolls-Royce & Associates
Rolls-Royce (Derby)
Ruddington Village
Shirebrook Miners Welfare
Slack & Parr
Stanton
Stapleford Old Boys
Staveley Works
Staveley Works Reserves
Sutton Town Reserves
TI Chesterfield
Teversal & Silverhill
Tobruk Hall
Tollerton Rangers
West Hallam
West Hallam Reserves
Wilmorton & Alvaston

References

 
Defunct football leagues in England
1967 establishments in England
1985 disestablishments in England